Eurymerodesmidae is a family of flat-backed millipedes in the order Polydesmida. There are at least 2 genera and 30 described species in Eurymerodesmidae.

Genera
 Eurymerodesmus Brolemann, 1900
 Paresmus

References

Further reading

 
 
 
 

Polydesmida
Millipede families